Bernard Meakin (5 March 1885 – 17 February 1964) was an English cricketer. He played for Gloucestershire between 1906 and 1922.

References

1885 births
1964 deaths
English cricketers
Gloucestershire cricketers
People from Stone, Staffordshire
Staffordshire cricketers
Staffordshire cricket captains
Cambridge University cricketers
Minor Counties cricketers
Free Foresters cricketers